Tłuszcz railway station is a railway station serving Tłuszcz in Masovian Voivodeship, Poland. It is served by Koleje Mazowieckie (who run services from Warszawa Zachodnia to Małkinia and from Tłuszcz to Ostrołęka) Przewozy Regionalne and PKP Intercity (TLK services). The station was opened in 1862.

References
Station article at kolej.one.pl

External links 
 

Railway stations in Poland opened in 1862
Railway stations in Masovian Voivodeship
Railway stations served by Koleje Mazowieckie
Wołomin County
1862 establishments in the Russian Empire